Jomvu is a settlement and Sub-County in Kenya's Coast Province.

References 

Populated places in Coast Province
Mombasa County